The System Dynamics Society is an international, nonprofit organization formed in 1983.

History 
The society was formed in 1983 through resolution passed by 120 delegates naming Jay Forrester as the first president.

The activity of the society has thereafter continued both to hold an international, annual conference and to sponsor publications of research in the area.

Governance 
The society is structured into officers and policy council members , standing committees and Home office teams.

List of presidents of the System Dynamics Society 

 2023 - Shayne Gary – University of New South Wales - Australia
 2022 - J. Bradley Morrison – Brandeis University - United States of America
 2021 - Paulo Gonclaves - University of Lugano, Switzerland
 2020 - Birgit Kopainsky - University of Bergen, Norway
 2019 - Martin F. G. Schaffernicht – Universidad de Talca, Chile
 2018 - I. Martínez-Moyano – Argonne National Laboratory, United States of America
 2017 - Leonard Malczynski - Sandia National Laboratories - United States of America
 2016 - Etiënne A.J.A. Rouwette - Radboud University - The Netherlands
 2015 - Jürgen Strohhecker - Frankfurt School of Finance and Management - Germany
 2014 - Edward G. Anderson - University of Texas - United States of America
 2013 - Kim Warren - London Business School - United Kingdom
 2012 - David Ford - Texas A&M University - United States of America
 2011 - David Lane - London School of Economics - United Kingdom
 2010 - Rogelio Oliva - Texas A&M University - United States of America
 2009 - Erling Moxnes - University of Bergen - Norway
 2008 - James M. Lyneis - Worcester Polytechnic Institute - United States of America
 2007 - Qifan Wang - Huazhong University of Science and Technology - China
 2006 - Michael J. Radzicki - Worcester Polytechnic Institute - United States of America
 2005 - Graham Winch - University of Plymouth - United Kingdom
 2004 - Robert Eberlein - Worcester Polytechnic Institute - United States of America
 2003 - Pål I. Davidsen - University of Bergen - Norway
 2002 - James H. Hines, Jr. - Massachusetts Institute of Technology - United States of America
 2001 - Ali N. Mashayekhi - Sharif University of Technology - Iran 
 2000 - Jac A. M. Vennix - Radboud University - The Netherlands
 1999 - Alexander L. Pugh, III - Pugh-Roberts Associates - United States of America
 1998 - Yaman Barlas - Bogazici University - Turkey
 1997 - George P. Richardson - State University of New York at Albany - United States of America
 1996 - John D. W. Morecroft - London Business School - United Kingdom
 1995 - Khalid Saeed - Asian Institute of Technology - Thailand
 1994 - Andrew Ford - Washington State University - United States of America
 1993 - Peter M. Milling - University of Stuttgart - Germany
 1992 - John D. Sterman - Massachusetts Institute of Technology - United States of America
 1991 - Erich K. O. Zahn - University of Stuttgart - Germany
 1990 - Peter Gardiner - University of Southern California - United States of America
 1989 - Eric F. Wolstenholme - University of Bradford - United Kingdom
 1987-1988 - Nathan B. Forrester - Massachusetts Institute of Technology - United States of America
 1986-1987 - Dennis L. Meadows - Dartmouth College
 1985-1986 - Jørgen Randers - Ministry of Long-Term Planning - Norway
 1984-1985 - David F. Andersen - State University of New York at Albany - United States of America
 1983-1984 - Jay W. Forrester - Massachusetts Institute of Technology - United States of America

Chapters 
The society has the following chapters as of 2021:
 African Regional
ASEAN
 Benelux
 Brazil
 China
 German
 Indian
Indonesian
Iranian
 Italian
 Japanese
 Korean
 Latin American
Nigerian
Oceania (Australasian)
 Pakistanian
 Russian
South African
 Student
 Swiss
 United Kingdom

Economics Chapter 
The Economics Chapter of the System Dynamics Society is a part of the System Dynamics Society, which deals with different objectives concerning system dynamics. The objectives of this chapter are;

 To identify, extend and unify knowledge contributing to the understanding and betterment of economic systems through the use of System Dynamics.
 To promote the development of the fields of Economics and System Dynamics.
 To encourage and develop educational programs related to the behavior of economic systems.
 To promote pluralism within the economics profession.

To accomplish these objectives the Economics Chapter proposes to conduct chapter meetings and to publish a journal, newsletter, website, books, and other materials. The president in 2007 is I. David Wheat, Jr., Senior Lecturer in System Dynamics, University of Bergen, Norway. Immediate Past-President is Oleg V. Pavlov, Assistant Professor, Worcester Polytechnic Institute, USA. And there are currently 71 members in this chapter.

Special Interest Groups 
As of 2021, the Sustem Dynamics Society as the following Special Interest Groups  (SIG)
Agriculture & Food	
Asset Dynamics	
Biomedical	
Business	
Conflict, Defense, and Security	
Economics	
Education	
Energy	
Environmental	
Health Policy	
Model Analysis	
Pre-College Education	
Psychology and Human Behavior	
Social Impact	
Structural Racism	
Transportation	
Water

See also
 Institute for Operations Research and the Management Sciences

References

External links
 System Dynamics Society

Non-profit organizations based in New York (state)
Systems science societies
Scientific societies based in the United States